Jean-Luc may refer to:

In politics:
 Jean-Luc Bennahmias (born 1954), a French politician and Member of the European Parliament
 Jean-Luc Dehaene (1940–2014), a Flemish politician
 Jean-Luc Laurent (born 1957), a French politician
 Jean-Luc Mandaba (1943–2000), a former Prime Minister of the Central African Republic
 Jean-Luc Mélenchon (born 1951), a French politician
 Jean-Luc Pépin (1924–1995), a Canadian academic, politician, and Cabinet member
 Jean-Luc Poudroux (born 1950), a French politician
 
In entertainment:
 Jean-Luc De Meyer (born 1957), a Belgian vocalist and lyricist best known as the lead vocalist of Front 242
 Jean-Luc Ponty (born 1942), a French virtuoso violinist and jazz composer
 Jean-Luc Picard, a fictional starship captain in the Star Trek universe
 Jean-Luc Bilodeau (born 1990), an actor, played Josh Trager on the television show Kyle XY and Ben Wheeler on Baby Daddy
 Jean-Luc Pikachu, a fictional animal in the animal capture show, Pokémon

In other fields:

Jean-Luc Cairon (1962–2022), French gymnast and coach
 Jean-Luc Godard (1930–2022), a Franco-Swiss filmmaker
 Jean-Luc Grand-Pierre (born 1977), a Canadian professional ice hockey defenceman
 Jean-Luc Lagardère (1928–2003), a major French businessman
 Jean-Luc Margot (born 1969), a Belgian astronomer and Professor at UCLA
 Jean-Luc Marion (born 1946), a French philosopher
 Jean-Luc Nancy (1940–2021), a French philosopher
 Jean-Luc du Plessis (born 1994), a South African Rugby Union player

Variants in other languages  
 English : John Luke
 Italian : Gianluca 
 French : Jean-Luc 
 Spanish : Juan Lucas 
 Portuguese : João Lucas 

Compound given names
French masculine given names